Kolisko is a surname. Notable people with the surname include:

 Alexander Kolisko (1857–1918), Austrian anatomist, pathologist
 Rudolf Kolisko (1859–1942), Austrian politician
 Hans Kolisko (1861–1917), Austrian businessman
 Eugen Kolisko (1893–1939), Austrian-German physician, educator